James John Klobuchar (April 9, 1928 – May 12, 2021) was an American journalist, author, and newspaper columnist from Minnesota. Klobuchar was regarded as a regionally well-known and admired local sports and politics reporter during his long career working for the Star Tribune in Minneapolis. 

Klobuchar notably was the first reporter in the country to declare John F. Kennedy's victory over Richard Nixon in the 1960 United States presidential election. He was the father of Minnesota U.S. Senator and former Hennepin County attorney Amy Klobuchar.

Early life
Klobuchar was born in Ely, Minnesota, the son of Mary (Pucel) and Michael Klobuchar. His grandparents were all from Slovenia, and the surname Klobučar means "hatter" in Slovenian. He earned an Associate of Arts degree from Ely Junior College (now Vermilion Community College) in 1948 and a Bachelor of Arts, cum laude, from the University of Minnesota in 1950.

Career 
Klobuchar served in the United States Army from 1950 to 1952 and became a corporal. He worked as a wire editor for the Bismarck Tribune in North Dakota in 1950 and as a legislative reporter from 1952 to 1953.

He worked as a staff writer for the Associated Press in Minneapolis from 1953 to 1961 and with the Minneapolis Tribune from 1961 to 1965. He became a columnist for the Minneapolis Star starting in 1965 where he covered sports and politics.

Personal life 
Klobuchar married Rose Heuberger August 7, 1954 and had two children, Amy and Meagan. They divorced in 1976. He also was noted for his struggles with alcoholism.

During much of his life Klobuchar was an avid cyclist, and led the "Jaunt With Jim" group bicycle ride for 39 years.

Health and death
Towards the end of Klobuchar's life, he had Alzheimer's disease. He died at a care facility in Burnsville, Minnesota on May 12, 2021, at age 93. Amy Klobuchar announced the death, saying about her father, "He loved journalism. He loved sports and adventure. And we loved him." Minnesota Governor Tim Walz also paid tribute, stating "Our press community lost a giant in Jim Klobuchar's passing." Plans were also made to bury him in the Fort Snelling National Cemetery.

Books
 The Zest (and Best) of Klobuchar, Mark Zelenovich, Inc., 1967.
 True Hearts and Purple Heads, Minneapolis: Ross & Haines, 1970.
 Tarkenton, New York: Harper & Row, 1976. Co-author, Fran Tarkenton.
Will the Vikings Ever Win the Super Bowl? An Inside Look at the Minnesota Vikings of 1976, with Jeff Siemon's journal, New York: Harper & Row, 1977.
 Will America Accept Love at Halftime?, Ross & Haines, 1992
 Minstrel: My Adventure in Newspapering, Minneapolis: University of Minnesota Press, 1997.
 Pursued by Grace: A Newspaperman's Own Story of Spiritual Recovery, Minneapolis: Augsburg Fortress Publishers, 1998.
 The Cross Under the Acacia Tree: The Story of David and Eunice Simonson's Epic Mission in Africa, Minneapolis: Kirk House Publishers, 1999.
 Knights and Knaves of Autumn: 40 Years of Pro Football and the Minnesota Vikings, Cambridge, Minnesota: Adventure Publications, 2000.
 Sixty Minutes with God, Kirk House, 2003.  
 Walking Briskly Toward the Sunset, Nodin Press, 2005.

References

1928 births
2021 deaths
20th-century American journalists
20th-century American male writers
20th-century American writers
21st-century American non-fiction writers
American male journalists
American people of Slovenian descent
American sportswriters
Amy Klobuchar
Deaths from Alzheimer's disease
Journalists from Minnesota
Military personnel from Minnesota
Neurological disease deaths in Minnesota
People from Ely, Minnesota
Star Tribune people
The Christian Science Monitor people
United States Army non-commissioned officers
University of Minnesota alumni
Writers from Minnesota
21st-century American male writers